Peaches Honeyblossom Geldof (13 March 1989 – 6 or 7 April 2014) was an English columnist, television personality, and model.

Born and raised in London, Geldof was educated at Queen's College after her parents' divorce in 1996, and later moved to New York City, where she worked as a writer for the UK edition of Elle Girl magazine. She also worked in television, producing and developing her own television programmes which were broadcast in the United Kingdom in 2006. In the later part of her life, Geldof worked primarily in modelling and television, and gave birth to sons in 2012 and 2013.

Geldof was found dead at her home on 7 April 2014; the inquest found that she died of a heroin overdose.

Early life
Peaches Geldof was born in London on 13 March 1989, the second daughter of Bob Geldof and Paula Yates and a granddaughter of Hughie Green. She had two sisters, Fifi Trixibelle Geldof (born 1983) Little Pixie Geldof (born 1990) and one half-sister, Heavenly Hiraani Tiger Lily Hutchence (born 1996).

She grew up in Chelsea, London, and Faversham, Kent, and was educated at Queen's College, London. After moving out of her father's house at the age of eighteen, she rented a flat in Islington, London. She completed her A-Levels and was accepted at Queen Mary & Westfield College, University of London, where she planned to study English literature and journalism, but deferred it to move to New York City with her then-husband, Max Drummey.

Career

Geldof wrote a magazine column for the UK edition of Elle Girl, starting with its April 2004 issue and continuing until the magazine folded in October 2005. From the ages of 14 to 17, she wrote a weekly socio-political column for The Daily Telegraph, and wrote numerous articles for The Guardian.

In 2005, she wrote and presented her own documentary television programme, Peaches Geldof: Teenage Spirit, which was followed up by Peaches Geldof: Teen America, which aired on Sky One on 1 March 2006. In 2006, Geldof was placed at number seven in the Tatler'''s list of Top Ten Fashion Icons for the year, the youngest person on the list. In 2007, readers of FHM voted her the 53rd sexiest woman in the world.

In September 2007, she made her catwalk début modelling for PPQ at London Fashion Week. She was also announced as the face of the Australian fashion line Dotti. Premiering on 19 October 2008 was Peaches: Disappear Here, an MTV One reality series in which she founded a new youth-oriented magazine.

In 2009, she was signed to a six-figure modelling deal to become the face of the Miss Ultimo collection. In 2010 she was dropped from Ultimo after nude pictures and allegations of drug use were posted on the Internet and published in the media. Geldof denied the claims and said, "I am disappointed that Ultimo has decided not to extend my contract based on a wildly exaggerated account of a night in Los Angeles five months ago." Michelle Mone, the head of Ultimo underwear, said that "as a brand that targets young women, we feel it is impossible for Peaches to continue".

In 2011, Geldof presented a six-part ITV2 series called OMG! with Peaches Geldof, a magazine-format chat and guest show with audience participation.

Personal life

Geldof was the second daughter of musician Bob Geldof and television presenter Paula Yates.

In 2000, when she was 11 years old, her mother died of a heroin overdose at the age of 41. In a 2013 interview with Elle magazine, Geldof explained how difficult the process of coming to terms with her mother's death was:

On 5 August 2008, Geldof married Max Drummey, an American musician from the band Chester French, at the Little White Wedding Chapel in Las Vegas. On 7 February 2009, the couple announced that they had amicably decided to end their marriage. In April 2011, Drummey filed for divorce in Los Angeles, citing irreconcilable differences.

For a while in 2010, she lived in the same house in Los Angeles as Christina Curry, the daughter of former MTV veejay Adam Curry and Dutch singer Patricia Paay. Plans for the two to make a reality television series for MTV were aborted for unknown reasons.

In June 2011, Geldof became engaged to Thomas Cohen, lead singer of the London band S.C.U.M. They were married on 8 September 2012, at the same church in Davington, Kent, where her parents married 26 years earlier, and also where her mother's funeral was held in 2000. Geldof had two sons with Cohen, born in 2012 and 2013.

Geldof professed to being a Scientologist during a 2009 interview with Fearne Cotton for the documentary series When Fearne Met Peaches Geldof'', and in November that year she attended the 25th anniversary of the International Association of Scientologists at Saint Hill Manor in East Grinstead, West Sussex. She later explored aspects of Judaism, and in 2013 began to express interest in the Ordo Templi Orientis (OTO), describing it as "a belief system to apply to day-to-day life to attain peacefulness". She had the initials OTO tattooed on her left forearm.

In 2013, Geldof released details that risked identifying victims of paedophile Ian Watkins, leading her to have to make a public apology.

Death
On 7 April 2014, Geldof was found dead at her home in Wrotham, Kent. The police found and seized drug paraphernalia at the house. Bob Geldof said in a statement: "We are beyond pain. She was the wildest, funniest, cleverest, wittiest and the most bonkers of all of us. We loved her and will cherish her forever." Her widower Thomas Cohen said in a statement: "My beloved wife Peaches was adored by myself and her two sons Astala and Phaedra and I shall bring them up with their mother in their hearts every day."

Geldof's funeral took place on 21 April 2014 at St Mary Magdalene and St Lawrence Church in Davington, Kent, the same church where she was married, where her parents were married, and where her mother's funeral service was held. The private service was attended by her father, husband, other family and friends and various members of the UK entertainment and fashion industries.

Inquest
The inquest opened into Geldof's death at Gravesend Old Town Hall on 1 May 2014. On 23 July, the coroner found that the cause of her death was opioid intoxication, and recorded a verdict of drug-related death. There was no evidence it was deliberate. Geldof had been taking the maintenance drug methadone for two and a half years before her death. On 3 July 2015, Kent Police announced that they had ended the investigation into her death, as they had "exhausted all lines of inquiry" trying to find out who had supplied Geldof with the Class A drug.

Notes

References

External links

The Guardian profile page

1989 births
2014 deaths
21st-century English writers
21st-century English women writers
The Daily Telegraph people
Deaths by heroin overdose in England
Drug-related deaths in England
English columnists
English female models
English people of Irish descent
English Scientologists
English socialites
English people of Scottish descent
English people of Welsh descent
English people of Belgian descent
English television presenters
English television talk show hosts
English television writers
English women journalists
Women television personalities
Journalists from London
Models from London
People educated at Queen's College, London
People from Chelsea, London
People from Faversham
Television personalities from London
The Guardian journalists
British women columnists
Writers from London
People from Westminster
British women television writers
People from Wrotham